Rogier Meijer (born 5 September 1981) is a Dutch professional football coach and former player, who is the head coach of Eredivisie club NEC.

As a player, Meijer appeared his entire professional career for De Graafschap as a midfielder. In May 2014, Meijer announced his retirement from professional football. After a year at his former amateur team VIOD, Meijer completely stopped playing football.

Coaching career
In his last year as an active footballer, Meijer was hired by De Graafschap as the manager of the U14's. In the summer 2015, he became U19 manager for the club which he was until the end of the 2016/17 season.

In April 2017, it was announced that Meijer would take charge of the U19 team at NEC in the upcoming season. On 3 April 2019, he was appointed as assistant manager for the first team until the end of the season.

In June 2020, Meijer was appointed new head coach of NEC, signing a one-year contract.

Career statistics 

Last update: 20 August 2014

References

External links
Rogier Meijer at Voetbal International

1981 births
Living people
People from Doetinchem
Footballers from Gelderland
Dutch footballers
Association football midfielders
De Graafschap players
Eredivisie players
Eerste Divisie players
Dutch football managers
De Graafschap non-playing staff
NEC Nijmegen non-playing staff
NEC Nijmegen managers
Eerste Divisie managers
Eredivisie managers
20th-century Dutch people
21st-century Dutch people